Crişana may also refer to:

 Crișana (newspaper), local newspaper based in Oradea
 Crișana, historical region of Romania and Hungary
 Crișana Oradea, football club based in Oradea, Romania
 Stadionul Crișana, a multi-use stadium in Sebiș, Romania
 Crișana dialect, one of the dialects of the Romanian language

See also 
 Criș (disambiguation)
 Crișan (disambiguation)
 Crișeni (disambiguation)
 Crișuri (disambiguation)